Mikhail Pavlovich (von) Azanchevsky,  – ) was a Russian composer and music teacher. He was the director of the St. Petersburg Conservatory in 1871-1876. Not long before his death, Edward Dannreuther called him "one of the most cultivated of living Russian musicians," and commented on "the delicate finish of diction and form which characterises his compositions, as well as for the extensive range of his knowledge in musical matters generally."

Life
He was born in Moscow, the son of the writer . He completed his education in counterpoint and composition under Moritz Hauptmann and Ernst Richter at Leipzig Conservatory between the years 1861 and 1864, and lived during some years subsequently, alternately at Paris and at St. Petersburg. He acquired a reputation among book-collectors as the possessor of one of the finest private libraries of works upon music in Europe.

Works
Among his best-known compositions are: 
Op. 2, Sonata in B minor for pianoforte and violoncello
Op. 10, Trio in F sharp minor for piano and strings;
Op. 12, Fest-Polonaise for two pianofortes; Passatempo for piano à quatre mains.

Notes

References
 

Russian composers
Russian male composers
Academic staff of Saint Petersburg Conservatory
1839 births
1881 deaths
19th-century composers
19th-century male musicians from the Russian Empire